Chris Gros, a poker dealer Caesars Casino in Las Vegas, won a World Series of Poker bracelet at the 2006 $500 Casino Employees No Limit Hold'em tournament.

Chris' winning hand was a 3 of clubs and a 4 of hearts, when the flop came up 3-3-8, he succeeded in getting his opponent to move all-in.  The 2006 Employee Championship was the largest employee only event in WSOP history.

When Chris won, he says that his first thought was, "Oh my God, I don't have to worry about a mortgage payment for a looong time." Upon thinking about it, Gros decided, "it would be silly to put money in the house when I can invest in other things-like poker."

World Series of Poker bracelets

References

American poker players
World Series of Poker bracelet winners
Year of birth missing (living people)
Living people